Gabriel Jones may refer to:

 Gabriel Jones (politician) (1724–1806), 18th-century Welsh American lawyer and legislator
 Gabriel L. Jones (1858–1915), teacher, public official, and state legislator in Indiana
 Gabe Jones, fictional character appearing in American comic books
 Gabe Jones (soccer) (born 1973), American soccer player
 John Gabriel Jones (1752–1776), colonial American pioneer and politician